Aguanqueterique is a municipality in the Honduran department of La Paz. As of 2001 it had a population of 4620.

Demographics
At the time of the 2013 Honduras census, Aguanqueterique municipality had a population of 4,738. Of these, 65.23% were Indigenous (65.09% Lenca), 32.92%, Mestizo, 1.58% White, 0.25% Black or Afro-Honduran and 0.02% others.

References

Municipalities of the La Paz Department (Honduras)